José Carruana Gálvez (1890 - Unknown) was a Spanish footballer who played as a defender for RCD Espanyol and Sociedad Gimnástica.

Club career
Born in Madrid, Carruana began his career aged just 18, in 1908, at his hometown club Club Español de Madrid, playing a pivotal role in the club's first piece of silverware, the 1908–09 Centro Championship, and then helped Español reach the 1909 Copa del Rey Final, which they lost 1-3 to Club Ciclista. His great displays earned him a move to RS Gimnástica in 1909, featuring alongside the likes of José Manuel Kindelán and Sócrates Quintana. At Gimnástica, Carruana did not lose his way, as he once again played an important role in the first piece of silverware of a club, this time being the 1909–10 Centro Championship, winning it again in 1910–11. In 1912, he helped Gimnástica reach which still remains the only Copa del Rey final in the club's history, which they lost 0-2 to FC Barcelona. He was then signed by RCD Espanyol, but his spell in Catalonia only lasted one season, before returning to Madrid and Gimnástica, winning yet another Centro Championship in 1913–14.

International career
Being a Sociedad Gimnástica player, he was eligible to play for the Madrid national team. He was a member of the Madrid side that participated in the first edition of the Prince of Asturias Cup in 1915, an inter-regional competition organized by the RFEF. Carruana was also a member of the Madrid team that participated in the following edition, in which they finished as runner-ups to Catalonia.

Honours

Club
Club Español de Madrid
Centro Championship:
Champions (1): 1908–09

Copa del Rey:
Runner-up (1): 1909

-

RS Gimnástica
Centro Championship:
Champions (3): 1909–10, 1910–11 and 1913–14

Copa del Rey:
Runner-up (1): 1912

International
Madrid XI
Prince of Asturias Cup:
Runner-ups (1): 1916

References

1890 births
Year of death missing
Spanish footballers
Association football defenders
Footballers from Madrid
RCD Espanyol footballers